William Robert Aufrère "Bob" Dawson,  (23 June 1891 – 3 December 1918) was a British Army officer in the First World War. He was awarded the Distinguished Service Order (DSO) on four occasions for his actions in command of the 6th (Service) Battalion, Queen's Own (Royal West Kent) Regiment from 1916 to his death in 1918, and Mentioned in Despatches at least five times. He was wounded in action at least seven times.

Early life
Dawson was the son of William and Ethel Dawson, of Cold Ash near Newbury, Berkshire.  His father was a lawyer, and his mother also became a solicitor.  His grandfather Henry Hill Dawson had served as a captain in the 19th Regiment of Foot.

He was the brother of Colin Aufrère Dawson, who served as a Lieutenant in the mechanical transport section of the Royal Army Service Corps, and was the last solicitor at the family firm, Dawsons, that traced its history to Edward Woodcock, the first solicitor to register in March 1729. The first Dawson in the firm was William Hill Dawson in 1855, and the last was Colin Aufrère Dawson in 1958.  The firm merged with Penningtons in 2011, and with Manches in 2013.

Noel Dawson was another brother.

His French middle name derives from an 18th-century Huguenot relative, Jeanne Aufrère, daughter of Rev. Antoine Aufrère, Marquis de Corville and minister of the French congregation at the Savoy Chapel; her daughter Sarah with Canon Balthazar Regis married William Dawson.  Their son, also William, married a cousin, Sophia Aufrère.

Through William and Sophia, Bob Dawson was distantly related to historian Christopher Dawson.

He was educated at Bradfield College from May 1905 to July 1910 and Oriel College, Oxford.

Army career
Dawson studied law at Oriel College, Oxford.  He was a Cadet in the Officers' Training Corps at Oxford University and joined the Royal Field Artillery in 1912. He transferred to the Queen's Own (Royal West Kent) Regiment in June 1914.  Most of the 1st Battalion was sent to France when the First World War broke out in August 1914, but Dawson remained in England to help form a 6th (Service) Battalion. He was promoted from second lieutenant to lieutenant in September 1914, then temporary captain in March 1915.

He served with the Royal West Kent Regiment on the Western Front from June 1915, in the 12th Division, and commanded the 6th Battalion from 1916 to his death in 1918. He refused staff appointments and the possibility of promotion to command a brigade in favour of remaining with his battalion, which became known as "Dawson's battalion". Dawson was often wounded, leading from the front. The unit served south of Ypres, at Hulluch near Loos, at the craters near Vermelles, was in reserve at the Battle of the Somme in July 1916, but joined the offensive on Ovillers, and then at Gueudecourt in October 1916.

He became temporary major when second in command of a battalion in August 1916, and formally took command of the 6th Battalion in November 1916 as acting lieutenant colonel, aged just 25. He was promoted to the substantive rank of captain in December 1916, and in January 1917 was promoted from acting lieutenant colonel when in command of a battalion to command a battalion in the rank of temporary lieutenant colonel (with seniority from December 1916).

He was wounded twice in 1916, He was wounded at Monchy near Arras in May 1917 but returned to command in August 1917. He was wounded again at Cambrai in November 1917. He returned to command in February 1918, and was wounded again in March in the German spring offensive. He was promoted to brevet major and returned to command in June 1918 for the Hundred Days Offensive.

He was severely wounded by an artillery shell near Nivelle on 23 October 1918. After a long period in the 20th General Hospital at Camiers, during which time he was visited by his parents, he died of wounds in December 1918. Although he had wished that his body should be returned to England, he was buried at Étaples Military Cemetery and is commemorated at St Margaret's at Cliffe

His first DSO was gazetted in April 1916, with the first Bar in July 1917, a second Bar in June 1918, and a third Bar (posthumously) in March 1919 (and citation in October 1919). He was also Mentioned in Despatches in June 1916, December 1917, and May 1918, and then (posthumously) in December 1918, and July 1919.

References

 "DAWSON, Major (temp. Lt-Col) William Robert Aufrère", Who Was Who, A & C Black, an imprint of Bloomsbury Publishing plc, 1920–2007; online edn, Oxford University Press, Dec 2007 accessed 31 Dec 2013
 The Queen's Own Gazette, Spring 2012, p. 5–6 
 Lieutenant-Colonel W R A Dawson
 History, Penningtons Manches
 The Soldier's War: The Great War through Veterans' Eyes, Richard van Emden, p. 188
 The London Gazette, 3 October 1919, Issue 31583, Page 12213
 St Margaret's at Cliffe
 Roll of Honour, St Margaret's at Cliffe, 
 War memorial, St Mark's Church, Cold Ash, West Berkshire war memorials
 Manuscript Roll of Honour, St Mark's Church, Cold Ash, West Berkshire war memorials
 Casualty details, Commonwealth War Graves Commission
 Lieutenant-Colonel William Robert Aufrere Dawson, P.E. Hodgkinson, 15 February 2015

1891 births
1918 deaths
Military personnel from Kent
Alumni of Oriel College, Oxford
British Army personnel of World War I
Companions of the Distinguished Service Order
People educated at Bradford Grammar School
British military personnel killed in World War I
Burials at Étaples Military Cemetery
Officers' Training Corps officers
Royal Field Artillery officers
Queen's Own Royal West Kent Regiment officers